Hugh Gusterson is an anthropologist at the University of British Columbia and George Washington University.  His work focuses on nuclear culture, international security and the anthropology of science. His articles have appeared in the LA Times, the Boston Globe, the Boston Review the Washington Post, the Chronicle of Higher Education, Foreign Policy, and American Scientist. He is a regular contributor to the Bulletin of the Atomic Scientists and has a regular column in Sapiens, an anthropology journal.

Biography
Hugh Gusterson grew up in England.  He has a B.A. in history from Cambridge University, a master's degree in anthropology from the University of Pennsylvania (as a Thouron Scholar), and a PhD in anthropology from Stanford University.  He taught at MIT from 1992-2006 before moving to George Mason University and George Washington University. Since 2020 he has taught for the anthropology department of the University of British Columbia.

His early work was on the culture of nuclear weapons scientists and antinuclear activists. In that work he explored weapons scientists' and activists' contending social constructions of weaponry and international peace and security.  More recently he has written on teenage use of alcohol. and counterinsurgency in Iraq and Afghanistan, arguing that U.S. counterinsurgency campaigns would fail and, in the process, damage U.S. civil society as well as Iraq and Afghanistan.  In 2016 he published a book Drone on drone warfare that won the Roy C. Palmer Civil Liberties Prize at the Chicago-Kent College of Law. A leading critic of attempts to recruit anthropologists for counterinsurgency work, he is one of the founders of the Network of Concerned Anthropologists.  He is currently researching the polygraph, as well as conducting a research project on nuclear waste disposition in Australia.

Gusterson served on the American Association of Anthropology's Executive Board from 2009–12, co-chaired the committee that rewrote the Association's ethics code 2012, and currently serves on the Association's Task Force on Engagement with Israel/Palestine.  He was President of the American Ethnological Society from 2016-18.  He won the American Anthropological Association's anthropology in media award in 2020.

He is married to Allison Macfarlane, former chairman of the Nuclear Regulatory Commission (NRC). They have two children.

Works 
 Nuclear Rites: A Weapons Laboratory at the End of the Cold War, University of California Press, 1998, 
 People of the Bomb: Portraits of America's Nuclear Complex, University of Minnesota Press, 2004, 
 Drone Remote Control Warfare, MIT Press, 2016,

Editor
 Why America's top pundits are wrong: anthropologists talk back, editors Catherine Lowe Besteman, Hugh Gusterson, University of California Press, 2005, 
 The insecure American: how we got here and what we should do about it, editors Hugh Gusterson, Catherine Lowe Besteman, University of California Press, 2009, 
 Cultures of Insecurity: States, Communities, and the Production of Danger, editors Jutta Weldes, Mark Laffey, Hugh Gusterson, and Raymond Duvall, University of Minnesota Press, 1999.
 The Counter-Counterinsurgency Manual: Or, Notes on Demilitarizing Anthropology, edited by Network of Concerned Anthropologists, Prickly Paradigm Press, 2009
  Life by Algorithms, University of Chicago Press, 2020

Videos
 "Surprising Fact about Political Views of Nuclear Weapons Scientists", March 1, 2015 talk at the Helen Caldicott Symposium: The Dynamics of Possible Nuclear Extinction
 "Who are nuclear weapons scientists?", July 6, 2016 talk at TedxFoggyBottom at the George Washington University
"Ethical Implications of Drone Warfare," February 5, 2019, LEAP Initiative Series at the Elliott School of International Affairs at the George Washington University.
"Democracy, Hypocrisy, First Use" Harvard University November 4, 2017
 American Ethnological Society Presidential address July 10, 2017

Chapters
 "Remembering Hiroshima at a Nuclear Weapons Laboratory", Living with the bomb: American and Japanese cultural conflicts in the Nuclear Age, editors Laura Elizabeth Hein, Mark Selden,M.E. Sharpe, 1997, 
 "Nuclear Weapons Testing", Naked science: anthropological inquiry into boundaries, power, and knowledge, editor	Laura Nader, Psychology Press, 1996, 
 "Becoming a Weapons Scientist", Technoscientific imaginaries: conversations, profiles, and memoirs, editor George E. Marcus, University of Chicago Press, 1995, 
 "A Pedagogy of Diminishing Returns: Scientific Involution across Three Generations of Nuclear Weapons Science", Pedagogy and the practice of science: historical and contemporary perspectives, editor David Kaiser, MIT Press, 2005, 
 "Missing the End of the Cold War in International Security", Cultures of insecurity: states, communities, and the production of danger, editor Jutta Weldes, U of Minnesota Press, 1999,

Interviews 
 "AE Interviews Hugh Gusterson (George Washington University): A conversation on his latest book Drone: Remote Control Warfare"
 Conversations in Anthropology@Deakin (Episode #10): Hugh Gusterson
  Covid and Culture interview on KNME TV, December 19, 2020

Other scholarly references 
 Academia.edu

References

Living people
George Washington University faculty
Alumni of the University of Cambridge
University of Pennsylvania alumni
Stanford University alumni
MIT School of Humanities, Arts, and Social Sciences faculty
George Mason University faculty
20th-century American anthropologists
21st-century American anthropologists
Year of birth missing (living people)